Pietrzyków may refer to the following places in Poland:
Pietrzyków, Lower Silesian Voivodeship (south-west Poland)
Pietrzyków, Kalisz County in Greater Poland Voivodeship (west-central Poland)
Pietrzyków, Września County in Greater Poland Voivodeship (west-central Poland)
Pietrzyków, Lubusz Voivodeship (west Poland)